Battle of Haifa may refer to:
 Battle of Haifa (1918), a battle of World War I
 Battle of Haifa (1948)

See also
 Battle of Haifa Street, a battle of the Iraq War